Vilivere is a village in Kohila Parish, Rapla County, in northwestern Estonia.

Vilivere railway station on the Tallinn–Viljandi railway line, operated by Elron (rail transit), is a short distance from the village.

References

 

Villages in Rapla County